The Granvin Fjord is an arm of the Hardanger Fjord in the municipalities of Granvin and Ullensvang in Vestland county, Norway. It has its inlet at the part of the Hardanger Fjord known as the Inner Samla Fjord between two small peninsulas: Furenes by the village of Tjoflot on the east side and Håstabbenes on the west side. From there, the fjord runs in a northeast direction to the village of Granvin at the head of the fjord.

Norwegian National Road 7 runs along the entire west side of the fjord. It passes through the village of Kvanndal, about  into the fjord, where there is a ferry connection across the Hardanger Fjord to Utne and Kinsarvik. The village of Folkedal lies  further into the fjord, just before the Folkedal Tunnel. On the east side, across the fjord from Folkedal, is the village of Hamre. There are no significant settlements between these two villages and the head of the fjord.

See also
 List of Norwegian fjords

References

Fjords of Vestland
Voss
Ullensvang